Tracy Leonard Walker III (born February 1, 1995) is an American football safety for the Detroit Lions of the National Football League (NFL). He played college football at Louisiana.

Professional career
On December 16, 2017, it was announced that Walker had accepted his invitation to play in the East-West Shrine Game. Walker impressed scouts and team representatives during Shrine Game practices which added value to his draft stock. On January 20, 2018, Walker played in the 2018 East–West Shrine Game and recorded two tackles and deflected a pass, but dropped an interception and was part of the East team that lost 14–10 to the West. Walker attended the NFL Scouting Combine and completed all of the required combine and positional drills. On April 5, 2018, Walker attended Louisiana's pro day, but chose to stand on his combine numbers and only performed positional drills. At the conclusion of the pre-draft process, Walker was projected to be a fifth or sixth round pick by NFL draft experts and scouts. He was ranked as the seventh best strong safety prospect in the draft by DraftScout.com and was ranked as the 12th best safety by Scouts Inc.

The Detroit Lions selected Walker in the third round (82nd overall) of the 2018 NFL Draft. Walker was the sixth safety drafted in 2018.

On May 16, 2018, the Detroit Lions signed Walker to a four-year, $3.51 million contract that includes a signing bonus of $881,988.

2018 season
Late into a Week 2 matchup against the San Francisco 49ers, Walker intercepted Jimmy Garoppolo for his first and potential game-winning interception, but the interception was overturned after a holding penalty on the Lions. In a Week 11 matchup against the Carolina Panthers, Walker recorded his first interception when he picked off Cam Newton in a contested grab for the ball. Walker ended the season with  21 tackles, two defended passes and one interception. Pro Football Focus rated Walker the fourth best defensive player on the Lions.

2019 season
In the offseason, the Lions released veteran Glover Quin which allowed more room for Walker to move up the depth chart. In the Lions' Week 1 debut against the Arizona Cardinals, Walker recorded the most tackles and recorded his second interception in a 27–27 tie. In an unpopular decision, the Lions traded away star safety Quandre Diggs to the Seattle Seahawks, allowing Walker to become the leading safety.

During a 31–26 Week 8 win against the New York Giants, Walker suffered a knee injury during the third quarter causing him to miss three of the next four games.

Walker ended the season with one interception, 103 tackles, and 8 defended passes.

2020 season
Walker's performance slowed in 2020, recording zero interceptions and four defended passes. However, Walker shined in Week 17 against the Minnesota Vikings, leading the team with 13 tackles (11 solo) and recording his first career sack on Kirk Cousins during the 37–35 loss.

2021 season
In Week 18 of the 2021 season, Walker had 13 tackles and an interception in a 37-30 win over the Packers, earning NFC Defensive Player of the Week.

Walker ended the season with 108 tackles, one interception, and 6 defended passes.

2022 season
On March 15, 2022, Walker signed a three-year, $25 million contract extension with the Lions through the 2024 season.

On September 27, 2022, Walker was placed on injured reserve after suffering a torn Achilles in Week 3.

NFL career statistics

Personal life
Walker is second cousins with former Lions teammate Darius Slay. Another second cousin, Ahmaud Arbery, was murdered in February 2020.

References

External links
 Louisiana Ragin' Cajuns bio

1995 births
Living people
American football safeties
Detroit Lions players
Louisiana Ragin' Cajuns football players
People from Brunswick, Georgia
Players of American football from Georgia (U.S. state)